Following is a List of senators of Charente, people who have represented the department of Charente in the Senate of France.

Third Republic 

 Jean André (1876–1878)
 Auguste Hennessy (1876–1879)
 Guillaume de Bremond d'Ars (1879–1894)
 François Certain Canrobert (1879–1894)
 Édouard Martell (1890–1903) and 1912–1920
 Jean Laporte-Bisquit (1894–1903)
 Théophile Brothier (1894–1900)
 Paul Lacombe (1901–1903)
 Auguste Blanchier (1903–1912)
 Jules Brisson (1903–1912)
 Pierre Limouzain-Laplanche (1903–1928)
 Auguste Mulac (1912–1928)
 James Hennessy (1921–1945)
 Louis Delhoume (1928–1939}
 Léonide Babaud-Lacroze (1929–1945}
 René Gounin (1939–1945)

Fourth Republic

 Mariette Brion (1946–1948)
 René Simard (1946–1948)
 Pierre Marcilhacy (1948–1959)
 Guy Pascaud (1948–1959)

Fifth Republic

 Guy Pascaud (1959–1979)
 Pierre Marcilhacy (1959–1980)
 Alexandre Dumas (1979–1980)
 Pierre Lacour (1980–1996)
 Michel Alloncle (1980–1998)
 Philippe Arnaud (1996–2008)
 Henri de Richemont (1998–2008)
 Nicole Bonnefoy  (2008–2020)
 Michel Boutant (2008–2020)

References

 
Charente